The final of the Men's Long Jump event at the 2003 Pan American Games took place on Wednesday August 6, 2003. Title holder Iván Pedroso from Cuba won the title for the third time in a row.

Medalists

Records

Results

Notes

See also
2003 World Championships in Athletics – Men's long jump
Athletics at the 2004 Summer Olympics – Men's long jump

References
Results

Long jump, Men
2003